Pythium heterothallicum is a plant pathogen infecting spinach.

References

External links
 Index Fungorum
 USDA ARS Fungal Database

Water mould plant pathogens and diseases
Leaf vegetable diseases
heterothallicum
Spinach